Cameron Davis may refer to:

Cameron Davis (attorney), American environmental policy expert and lawyer
Cameron Davis (golfer) (born 1995), Australian golfer
Cameron Josiah Davis (1873–1952), American Episcopal priest
Cameron Davis (Days of Our Lives), a fictional character on Days of our Lives

See also
Davis Cameron, comic character